Ivana Prijović (born 4 February 1992) is a Serbian handball player who plays for the club Ardeşen GSK. She is member of the Serbian national team. She competed at the 2015 World Women's Handball Championship in Denmark.

References

1992 births
Living people
Serbian female handball players
Sportspeople from Šabac
Universiade medalists in handball
Universiade bronze medalists for Serbia
Medalists at the 2015 Summer Universiade